CEK may refer to:
 College of Engineering, Karunagappally, a Government  Engineering College in Kollam district of Kerala, India
 Cek (Quba), a village in the Quba Rayon of Azerbaijan
 Cek dialect, a dialect of the Kryts language, a Samur language of Azerbaijan
 Chelyabinsk Airport, in Russia
 Content encryption key, a cryptographic key type
 Eastern Khumi language (ISO 639-3: cek), Kukish language of Burma
 Özgür Çek (born 1991), Turkish footballer